Bulacan's 4th congressional district is one of the seven congressional districts of the Philippines in the province of Bulacan. It has been represented in the House of Representatives since 1987. The district consists of the city of Meycauayan and adjacent municipalities in southern Bulacan, namely Marilao, and Obando. It is currently represented in the 19th Congress by Linabelle Villarica of the PDP–Laban.

Representation history

Election history

2022
Incumbent Henry Villarica is running for Mayor of Meycauayan, switching places with his wife, incumbent Mayor Linabelle Ruth Villarica.

2019
Incumbent Linabelle Ruth Villarica was term-limited; she ran as City Mayor of Meycauayan instead. Her husband, incumbent Meycauayan City Mayor Henry Villarica ran unopposed for her seat.

2016
Incumbent Linabelle Villarica will run for her third and final term. Her opponent is Meycauayan City Mayor Joan Alarilla.

2013
Linabelle Villarica is the incumbent.
m

2010
Reylina Nicolas (Lakas-Kampi-CMD) is in her third consecutive term already and is ineligible for reelection.

See also
Legislative districts of Bulacan

References

Congressional districts of the Philippines
Politics of Bulacan
1987 establishments in the Philippines
Congressional districts of Central Luzon
Constituencies established in 1987